Chrostosoma tricolor is a moth of the subfamily Arctiinae. It was described by Felder in 1868. It is found in the Amazon region.

References

Biodiversity Heritage Library

Chrostosoma
Moths described in 1868